Little Door Gods, also known as Door Guardians, or The Guardian Brothers in the US, is a 2016 Chinese animated fantasy comedy film directed and written by Gary Wang, produced by Light Chaser Animation Studios and distributed by Alibaba Pictures. It was originally released in China on January 1, 2016. An English-language version that is 20 minutes shorter premiered on Netflix on September 1, 2017.

It is the last film to be fully co-produced by The Weinstein Company, following a series of sexual assault cases against its founder, Harvey Weinstein.

Plot

A long time ago, humans placed posters of Guardian spirits on their doors so the spirits can helped them with their problems, but humans became less dependent on spirits over time. In the present, a girl named Raindrop and her mother come to little town in which three generations of their family ran a soup shop that served only wonton soup; the restaurant's doors adorn by posters of Shen Tu and his brother Yu Lei. When Raindrop's grandmother passes away during their visit, ownership of the soup shop in inherited by her mother Luli as they launch a floating lantern with their grandmother's music box attached in a traditional ritual to send it to the spirit world.

The music box ends up entangled in the Ancient Tree and found by Yu Lei, who is discouraged by Shen Yu to touch the music box as it is dangerous to touch human things per the rules established by the Spirit World's mayor. The two brothers argue until they come upon an old spirit named Backett, who reveal the impending downsizing by the Spirit World's new management despite wanting to help humans. The three are taken to the mayor's abode by the mayor's assistant Dean and the mighty babies, Yu Lei meeting with a giant spirit Colossus who hints of running a secret errand in the human world. The mayor then outs Beckett for going against his decree by helping a fallen old woman, having his security strip Beckett of his robes before exiling him. The brothers walk together with Beckett, explaining his complaint about the human world's suffering. He tells the brothers the story of the Nian, an ancient evil that forced humans and spirits to work together by sealing it away in three pieces. Yu Lei deliberately plans to release the Nian to have humans and spirits communicate again, Becklett giving Yu Lei a magical leaf that will help him find the seals. After returning home, the brothers argue over whether or not they should be helping humans. But after Dean reveals the mayor orders them to destroy their portal, Yu Lei decides to enter the human world despite Shen Tu's attempt to stop him.

At the same time, Raindrop has trouble fitting into her new home while she and her mother have to deal with restaurant owner Mr. Rogman trying to buy the soup shop from them. Raindrop eventually runs off after arguing with her mother over the fate of the shop, ending up being chased by stray dogs after rescuing a frog from one before being saved by Yu Lei. After giving Raindrop a magic disc to keep her safe as she returns him, Yue Li locates the first seal in the river with Colossus guarding it. Colossus says that the mayor ordered him to protect the seal, but throws the fight out of their friendship so Yue Li can break the first seal to free a fish that turns into a dragon that takes the surrounding water along with Yu Lei's youth. Rain, dragged to the lake by Yu Lei's disk watches the dragon fly off.

With the city in the middle of a drought, Luli is tricked into accepting tainted water from Mr. Rogman that causes the shop to be closed down for selling rotten soup that induced Luli's customers with diarrhea. Shen Tu, having learned of Yu Lei's activities from Colossus, enters the human world where he also rescues Raindrop from the dogs. Rain recognizes Shen Tu as a guardian spirit and convinces him to save her mom's business, convincing the health inspector to review the soup shop after a cleaning. The health inspector clears Luli's business, closing down Rogman's place for cockroaches and an unsanitary kitchen. The soup shop fills up with customers and Shen Tu feels great about helping and he wonders if Yu Lei was right. Raindrop confronts Shen Tu about being a guardian and he explains he is looking for Yu Lei. The disk starts glowing and it leads them to Yu Lei.

Yu Lei reaches the second seal as it is guarded by a flower spirit named Bloom, who barely recognizes Yu Lei's aged appearance while keeping him from destroying the seal as she expresses annoyance of him constantly ignoring her in the spirit world and that he is too self-righteous to consider others' opinions. Rain and Shen Tu arrive as an exhausted Yu Lei takes advantage of Bloom's inattention to break the seal, causing her to be sucked into a vortex. Shen Tu protects Rain and Yu Lei from Bloom's petals as the effects manifest in the plants withering, the ancient tree destroying the lanterns it gathered, and insects swarm in town. Despite Shen Tu's attempts to convinced his brother to stop as he aged further and how Raindrop almost lost the soup shop, Yu Lei runs off. After bringing Rain home, Shen Tu takes the disc from her and returns to the spirit world to find his brother.

Yu Lei has aged even further, and Shen Tu argues that he needs to stop. He claims that aging is the consequence he has to bear, but Shen Tu points out that other people are suffering as well and Raindrop tells him about almost losing the shop. Shen Tu tells Yu Lei it has to stop. Yu Lei says it does not and then runs off. Raindrop picks up a handful of petals left by Bloom. Shen Tu and Rain decide that they have to stop Yu Lei to prevent him from breaking the seal. Back at the soup shop, Shen Tu takes the disk that Yu Lei gave Raindrop and goes back to the spirit world. Raindrop is upset at being abandoned. Shen Tu comes back home to find that the ancient tree is crushing all the lanterns. The following day, some of the petals Rain took end up in the soup and make it delicious. After making a nice profit, though they have no more petals and Shen Tu gone, Luli and Raindrop decide to try new soup recipes that make their restaurant extremely busy. Raindrop even makes friends as a consequence, making guardian posters for her former bullies.

Yu Lei finds the final seal in an old temple that is full of statues of himself, approached by an old man who reveals to also desire the Nian's freedom and that the entity had long watched Yu Lei and knew he would be able to endure breaking the seals and free it. At the same time, Shen Tu is confronted by Dean over Yu Lei's disappearance and ends up knocking him out and locking him and the might babies in a jar. Shen Tu eventually returns to Rain as she was being interrogated by Mr. Rogman, who was looking for the new soup recipe. Shen Tu knocks Mr. Rogman into the river before he and Rain go to find Yu Lei, unaware that Mr. Rogman rigged the soup pressure cooker to explode.

The two reach the temple to find Yu Lei destroying the statues before finding the final seal to the statue of him and his Shen Tu. Shen Tu admits to his brother that he was wrong while convincing to Yu Lei that he was wrong and move forward. Despite talking Yu Lei out of destroying the seal, he accidentally broke it while retrieving  Yu Lei's sword as they barely escape the collapsing building. Shen Tu carries his brother and Rain back to town as the townsfolk panic while the brothers' home begins manifesting in the human world. Shan Tu learns Raindrop with Luli before and Yu Lei enter the portal before the stove is destroyed by the pressure cooker exploding. The brothers return home as Dean frees himself, the Ancient Tree revealed to be the Nian as it attacks them while sending a mist-like extension of itself into town. But Rain, Luli, and town's residents manage to keep the mist at bay with fire crackers as they are joined by the mighty babies after they got knocked off the island.

The Nian assumes a more human-like form as Yu Lei admit his mistake, the mighty babies returning with fire works and damage the Nian. This reveals Nian's rock-like heart, which Yu Lei used to touch to control the tree. Yu Lei throws his disk at the rock, cracking it. The island keeps falling and the rock needs one hit to finish breaking it. Shen Tu uses the music box to do it. This causes the Nian to die and the island to rise back into the spirit world. Back at the spirit world, it turns out that Bloom and the old man lost their memories of how the seals were broken and were being returned to the queen to regain their memories. Shen Tu wakes up to find a young Yu Lei on their island, the brothers opening a restaurant for the spirits and Beckett joins them. While Mr. Rogman's lackeys repairing Raindrop and Luli's restaurant, the human world is happier knowing that the spirits are watching.

Voice cast

Original Chinese cast
Gao Xiaosong as Shen Tu
Show Joy as Laohu
White. K as Yu Lei
Ji Guanlin as Huaxia (Bloom)
Cindy Yu as Raindrop
Bi Xiaolan as Ying
Quangdu Bingba (向杜炳巴) as Tu
Seth I as himself

English dub cast
 Dan Fogler as Shen Tu
 Edward Norton as Yu Lei
 Bella Thorne as Raindrop "Rain"
 Nicole Kidman as Luli
 Mel Brooks as Mr. Rogman
 Meryl Streep as The Narrator
 Steven French as Dean/Colossus
 Cristina Pucelli as Bloom (Huaxia)

Reception

References

External links

2010s fantasy comedy films
2015 computer-animated films
Alibaba Pictures films
Animated comedy films
Chinese animated fantasy films
Chinese fantasy comedy films
2015 comedy films
Films scored by Nathan Wang
The Weinstein Company animated films
2010s American films
Chinese New Year films